Forced child labour has been reported to be widespread in the cotton industry in Uzbekistan.  A 2007 BBC Newsnight report stated that this forced labour occurs for two and a half months each year, in a cotton industry controlled completely by the Uzbek state. Radio Free Europe has reported Uzbek human rights activists as stating that the forced labour of children is "deliberate state policy".

A number of Western retail groups including Asda, Gap, Marks & Spencer and Tesco have boycotted the practice. Although officially banned, as of 2009, the practice has been reported to still be continuing.

Following widespread global coverage about these practices and in committing to end this practice, the Cabinet of Ministers of Uzbekistan declared its intent to ensure that no one under the age of 18 would participate in the cotton harvest, as highlighted in a report by the US Department of Labor. The same report also highlights that the Uzbek government also led a monitoring effort utilizing ILO methodology to observe the fall 2014 harvest in all cotton-growing regions of the country, finding 41 child labourers, assessing penalties to 19 school officials and farm managers for the use of child labour and removing children from the fields. In a few instances, reports indicate that a local government authority such as a district or regional governing official or town mayor may have directly ordered the mobilization of students under age 18.

Some NGOs, notably the Uzbek – German Forum for Human Rights (UGF), have attempted to raise awareness of these unethical practices, both worldwide and in Europe. UGF is supported by a host of non-profits and NGOs, including Save the Children Central Asia.

References

See also 
 Human rights in Uzbekistan

Uzbekistan
Labour
Labor in Uzbekistan
Poverty in Uzbekistan
Human rights abuses in Uzbekistan